The 218th New Jersey Legislature began on January 9, 2018 following the 2017 Elections. The session started in the end of Chris Christie's governorship and continued in the first two years of Phil Murphy's governorship.

Background 
The elections were held on November 7, 2017 alongside the 2017 New Jersey gubernatorial election. Phil Murphy and Sheila Oliver were elected Governor and Lieutenant Governor. In the elections for Senate republicans lost a net gain of one seat while in the Assembly elections republicans lost a net gain of two. In the only state senate election of 2019 incumbent Democratic Senator Bob Andrzejczak lost re-election to Republican Mike Testa.

Party composition

Assembly

Senate

Leadership

Senate

Assembly

Members

Senate 
Senators for the 2018-19 legislative session are:

† First appointed to the seat
‡ Elected in a special election
1 Addiego had served as a Republican prior to 2019

Former members from this term

Committees and Committee Chairs, 2018–2019 Legislative Session
Committee chairs are: (All are Democrats)

Assembly 
The Assembly has 80 members, two for each district.
Membership of the General Assembly is as follows:

Former members from this term

Committees and Committee Chairs, 2018–2019 Legislative Session
Committee chairs are: (All are Democrats)

Vacancies

Senate

Assembly

Governors 

Outgoing Governor Chris Christie delivered is last State of the State on January 9, 2018. He touted his legacy as Governor, such as his response to Hurricane Sandy, among other things.
On January 15, 2019 Governor Phil Murphy gave his first State of the State Address. In his address he called on the legislature to raise the minimum wage from $8 to $15, legalize recreational marijuana, and to act on tax reform. He also touted his achievements in his first year such as raising income taxes on people making more than $5 million a year, beginning to make community college tuition free, increasing funding to Planned Parenthood, and tighter gun laws.
Again on March 5, 2019 Murphy addressed the Legislature to deliver his budget address. In the address he called for universal pre-k, eliminating tuition for community college, a millionaires tax, and increased spending. Senate President Stephen M. Sweeney, and Assembly Speaker Craig Coughlin said they are opposed to Murphy's proposed tax increases. On June 20, 2019 the Assembly and Senate passed a budget without Murphy's millionaires tax. In the Senate, seven republicans, Declan O'Scanlon, Kip Bateman, Tom Kean, Kristin Corrado, Bob Singer, and Sam Thompson, voted for the budget. Murphy line-item vetoed the budget.

See also
 List of New Jersey state legislatures

Notes

References 

New Jersey Legislature
New Jersey General Assembly by session